Robert James Dexter (1890 – 20 June 1966), known as Gayne Dexter, was an Australian journalist, publicist and screenwriter. He was head of publicity at Union Theatres and Australasian Films in the 1910s, where his assistant was a young Ken G. Hall. He went on to become editor for Everyone's, the trade paper for the Australian film industry.

Screenwriter 
In the 1930s Dexter wrote two films for Ken G. Hall, The Squatter's Daughter (1933) and The Silence of Dean Maitland (1934). He also worked extensively overseas in New York City and London as head of publicity for Warner Bros. and doing publicity for stars such as Judy Garland and Danny Kaye.

Filmography 
For the Term of His Natural Life (1927) - titles
The Grey Glove (1928) - titles
The Romance of Runnibede (1928) - screenplay
The Squatter's Daughter (1933) - screenplay
The Silence of Dean Maitland (1934) - screenplay

References

External links 

Year of birth missing
1966 deaths
Australian screenwriters
Australian journalists
Date of birth missing
Place of birth missing
Place of death missing
Date of death missing
20th-century Australian screenwriters